Haworthia chloracantha is a species of succulent plant native to the Cape Province of South Africa. H. chloracantha has typically pale yellow-green leaves and is somewhat similar to Haworthia reticulata in form, but the leaves are opaque rather than translucent. It forms prolific clusters of plants. The plant has a few subvarieties including var. denticulifera, meaning has small teeth on its leaves, and var. subglauca, which has darker foliage.

References

External links

chloracantha
Flora of South Africa
Plants described in 1821